The 2018–19 season was Red Star's 13th in the Serbian SuperLiga and 73rd consecutive season in the top flight of Yugoslav and Serbian football. The club participated in the Serbian SuperLiga, the Serbian Cup and the UEFA Champions League.

Pre-season and friendlies

Competitions

Overview

Serbian SuperLiga

Season results summary

Regular season league table

Regular season result round by round

Regular season matches

Championship round league table

Championship round result round by round

Championship round matches

Serbian Cup

First round

Second round

Quarterfinal

Semifinal

Final

UEFA Champions League

First qualifying round

Second qualifying round

Third qualifying round

Play-off round

Group stage

Squad

Squad statistics

Goalscorers
Includes all competitive matches. The list is sorted by shirt number when total goals are equal.

Clean sheets
Includes all competitive matches. The list is sorted by shirt number when total clean sheets are equal.

Transfers

In

Out

Loan returns and promotions

Loan out

See also 
2018–19 KK Crvena zvezda season

Notes

References

Red Star Belgrade seasons
Red Star
Red Star
Serbian football championship-winning seasons